General elections were held in Tonga on 18 November 2021 to elect 17 of the 26 seats in the Legislative Assembly. 

Following the election four MPs were unseated for bribery.

Background
The 2017 general election resulted in a landslide victory for the Democratic Party of the Friendly Islands (or PTOA), and ʻAkilisi Pōhiva was re-elected as Prime Minister, defeating former Deputy Prime Minister Siaosi Sovaleni 14 votes to 12. In September 2019 Pohiva died, and Pohiva Tuʻiʻonetoa was elected as Prime Minister with the support of the nobles, independent MPs, and 5 former members of the DPFI. His cabinet included three nobles, who had previously been excluded under Pohiva.

In December 2020 Democratic party leader Semisi Sika submitted a motion of no-confidence in Prime Minister Tuʻiʻonetoa. The motion was backed by Deputy Prime Minister Sione Vuna Fa'otusia, who subsequently resigned from Cabinet. The Legislative Assembly rejected the no-confidence motion 13-9 on 12 January 2021.

Following ʻAkilisi Pōhiva's death the PTOA fragmented, with rivalries emerging between Siaosi Pohiva and his brother-in-law Mateni Tapueluelu. In the leadup to the election this led to a formal split, with Pohiva leaving the party's board and "core team".

In the leadup to the election Infrastructure and Tourism Minister ʻAkosita Lavulavu and her husband ʻEtuate Lavulavu, who had previously served as a Minister, were both convicted of obtaining money by false pretenses and sentenced to six years in prison by the Supreme Court.

Electoral system
The Legislative Assembly of Tonga has up to 30 members, of whom 17 are directly elected by first-past-the-post voting from single-member constituencies. The island of Tongatapu has ten constituencies, Vavaʻu three, Haʻapai two and ʻEua and Niuatoputapu/Niuafoʻou one each. Nine seats are held by members of the nobility, who elect representatives amongst themselves. The Cabinet formed by a Prime Minister may include up to four members not elected to the Assembly, who then automatically become members of the legislature. Around 60,000 voters were eligible to vote.

Campaign
Parliament was dissolved on 16 September. 75 candidates, including 12 women, registered to contest the election. One candidate, Sione Fonua, later withdrew, while a second one died, leaving 73 candidates in total. Despite a week-long lockdown due to a COVID-19 case, the election was not delayed.

Prime Minister Pohiva Tuʻiʻonetoa did not promote his Tonga People's Party during the campaign, and several Ministers ran as independents.

Results
Voters elected an all-male parliament, with nine new people's representatives. The leaders of both Democratic Party of the Friendly Islands (PTOA), Semisi Sika and Siaosi Pōhiva, lost their seats, as did other senior PTOA MP's. While the PTOA won majorities in most constituencies, vote-splitting between the rival factions saw them lose seats to independent candidates. Only three PTOA candidates were elected: Semisi Fakahau, Veivosa Taka and Saia Piukala. The People's Party formally retained only one seat, but may name its members after the elections.

The Electoral Commission reported that voter turnout was 62%.

People's seats

Nobles

Aftermath
Following the election Viliami Tangi was appointed interim Speaker. Three candidates initially announced their candidacy for Prime Minister: Interim Prime Minister Pohiva Tuʻiʻonetoa, former Finance Minister ʻAisake Eke, and former Deputy Prime Minister Siaosi Sovaleni. Tuʻiʻonetoa later withdrew his candidacy, leaving Sovaleni as the frontrunner. 

The Legislative Assembly met on 15 December to elect a Prime Minister, with both Sovaleni and Eke being nominated. Sovaleni was elected with 16 votes. Fatafehi Fakafanua was re-elected as Speaker. Sovaleni was formally appointed Prime Minister on 27 December, and announced his cabinet on 29 December. parliament was formally opened on 11 January 2022.

Following the election Pōhiva Tuʻiʻonetoa was found guilty of bribery in an election petition and stripped of his seat. Sangster Saulala was found guilty of two counts of bribery on 2 May 2022 and his election declared void. Tatafu Moeaki was found guilty of bribery on 6 May, and Poasi Tei on 13 May. Election petitions against Tevita Puloka and 'Uhilamoelangi Fasi were unsuccessful. On 26 May 2022 the convictions were stayed pending appeal. On 9 August 2022 the appeals by Saulala, Tei and Moeaki were dismissed, and their elections were confirmed as void. Tu’i’onetoa's appeal was upheld and he remains in parliament. Saulala, Tei and Moeaki were formally unseated by Parliament and their seats declared vacant on 10 August, sparking the 2022 Tongatapu by-elections.

References

Tonga
General election
Elections in Tonga
Tonga
Election and referendum articles with incomplete results